Firebirth is the tenth studio album released by Swiss hard rock band Gotthard. It is the first album with singer Nic Maeder after Steve Lee's death.

Track listing
All songs written by Leo Leoni, Freddy Scherer and Nic Maeder, except where indicated
 "Starlight" - 4:27
 "Give Me Real" - 3:38
 "Remember It's Me" - 3:27
 "Fight" - 3:25
 "Yppie Aye Yay" (Leoni, Scherer, Maeder, Marc Lynn, Paul Lani) - 4:37
 "Tell Me" (Leoni, Maeder) - 3:15
 "Shine" - 3:48
 "The Story's Over" - 4:09
 "Right On" - 3:52
 "S.O.S" - 3:22
 "Take It All Back" - 3:16
 "I Can" - 3:10
 "Where Are You?" (Leoni) - 4:19
 "I Love You Honey" - 3:04 (bonus track)
 "Starlight" (acoustic version) - 3:56 (bonus track)
 "While My Guitar Gently Weeps" (George Harrison) - 5:35 (bonus track)

Personnel
Gotthard
Nic Maeder – vocals
Leo Leoni – guitars, keyboards on track 13, producer, engineer, mixing on track 15
Freddy Scherer – guitars
Marc Lynn – bass guitar
Hena Habegger – drums and percussion

Additional musicians
Matthias Ulmer - keyboards

Production
Paul Lani - producer, engineer, mixing
Davide Pagano - engineer, mixing on track 15
Charlie Bauerfeind - mastering

Charts

Weekly charts

Year-end charts

References

2012 albums
Gotthard (band) albums
Nuclear Blast albums